The lateral collateral ligament (LCL, long external lateral ligament or fibular collateral ligament) is a ligament located on the lateral (outer) side of the knee, and thus belongs to the extrinsic knee ligaments and posterolateral corner of the knee.

Structure 
Rounded, more narrow and less broad than the medial collateral ligament, the lateral collateral ligament stretches obliquely downward and backward from the lateral epicondyle of the femur above, to the head of the fibula below.  In contrast to the medial collateral ligament, it is fused with neither the capsular ligament nor the lateral meniscus.
Because of this, the lateral collateral ligament is more flexible than its medial counterpart, and is therefore less susceptible to injury.

Both collateral ligaments are taut when the knee joint is in extension.  With the knee in flexion, the radius of curvatures of the condyles is decreased and the origin and insertions of the ligaments are brought closer together which make them lax.  The pair of ligaments thus stabilize the knee joint in the coronal plane.  Therefore, damage and rupture of these ligaments can be diagnosed by examining the knee's mediolateral (side) stability.

Immediately below its origin is the groove for the tendon of the popliteus.

The greater part of its lateral surface is covered by the tendon of the biceps femoris; the tendon, however, divides at its insertion into two parts, which are separated by the ligament.

Deep to the ligament are the tendon of the popliteus, and the inferior lateral genicular vessels and nerve.

Causes of injury
The LCL is usually injured as a result of varus force across the knee, which is a force pushing the knee from the medial (inner) side of the joint, causing stress on the outside. An example of this would be a direct blow to the inside of the knee. The LCL can also be injured by a noncontact injury, such as a hyperextension stress, again causing varus force across the knee.

An LCL injury usually occurs simultaneously as the other ligaments of the knee are injured. Multiple knee ligament tears and stresses can result from a significant trauma that includes direct blunt force to the knee, such as an automobile crash.

Symptoms
Symptoms of a sprain or tear of the LCL includes pain to the lateral aspect of the knee, instability of the knee when walking, swelling and ecchymosis (bruising) at the site of trauma.

Treatment
An isolated LCL tear or sprain rarely requires surgery. If the injury is a Grade 1 or Grade II, microscopic or partial macroscopic tearing respectively, the injury is treated with rest and rehabilitation. Ice, electrical stimulation and elevation are all methods to reduce the pain and swelling felt in the initial stages after the injury takes place. Physical therapy focuses on regaining full range-of-motion, such as biking, stretching and careful applications of pressure on the joint. Full recovery of Grade I or Grade II tears should take between 6 weeks and 3 months. Continued pain, swelling and instability to the joint after this time period may require surgical repair or reconstruction to the ligament.

Additional images

See also 
 Posterolateral knee injuries

References

External links
 

Knee ligaments